Katelyn Tarver (born November 2, 1989) is an American actress and singer-songwriter. She has independently released four EP's since 2011, most notably Tired Eyes in 2017. She is also known for her recurring roles as Jo Taylor on the Nickelodeon series Big Time Rush, Natalie on the ABC series No Ordinary Family, Jesse in HBO series Ballers and Mercedes on ABC Family The Secret Life of the American Teenager. She co-wrote "Crazy Stupid Love" for the British singer Cheryl which peaked at #1 on UK Singles Chart in 2014.

Career

Music
In 2003, Tarver took part in the reality television program American Juniors, where she was one of the Top 10 finalists, before being eliminated from the competition on August 12, 2003.

On June 14, 2011, Tarver independently released her debut EP, A Little More Free, produced by Matt Grabe. She was Honor Society's opening act on their June–July 2011 "Wherever You Are" tour. Tarver also toured alongside the bands The Cab and Parachute during the summer of 2012.

In 2014, Tarver co-wrote Cheryl Cole's 2014 single "Crazy Stupid Love". Two more singles, "Weekend Millionaires" and "Nobody Like You" were released on the streaming platform SoundCloud in 2015. "Weekend Millionaires" was re-released on iTunes, Spotify, and other digital retailers on July 28, 2016. Another new track, "What Do We Know Now", was released in October, followed shortly by the BURNS-produced "Hate To Tell You" the following month.

In 2015, Tarver was featured on the Lost Kings track "You", which was released by Spinnin' Records as a single off their EP The Bad. In 2016, Tarver released a cover of Jeremih's song "Planez".

Tarver's second EP, Tired Eyes, was released on March 10, 2017. The song, "You Don't Know" from the Tired Eyes, went viral on YouTube and amassed over 50 million views by the mid-2021. In 2018, Tarver released her third EP, Kool Aid. The EP received positive reviews from multiple music review websites including Clash.

In 2019, Tarver released five singles as well as her fourth EP, Kool Aid: Sugar Free (Acoustic). In 2020, she released nine singles including "Feel Bad". The music video of "Feel Bad" was directed by Se Oh and premiered on March 26, 2020, with Billboard. Later that year, Tarver co-wrote Jake Scott's song "Like No One Does". The single was released on April 7, 2020.

In 2021, Tarver collaborated with Will Anderson and launched a side-project called REAVES. The debut EP, The First EP, of the band was released on June 4, 2021.

Tarver was the winning songwriter on the Old Dominion episode of Songland, with her song "Young" being featured in a Jeep commercial, in which Tarver also starred.

Acting
On January 29, 2010, she made her acting debut on Big Time Rush as Jo Taylor, a girl the boys admire. Her debut episode was "Big Time Love Song" which aired on February 5, 2010. She developed feelings for Kendall Knight (Kendall Schmidt) and they started dating. But the world tour changed everything: Jo became a television star and Kendall became a pop star. On "Big Time Break-Up" which aired on June 25, 2011, she landed a role in a movie in New Zealand which would keep her and Kendall apart for 3 years. She returned in season 3's episode "Big Time Surprise", which aired on September 22, 2012.

From 2010 to 2011, Tarver appeared as Natalie Poston in 5 episodes of the ABC series No Ordinary Family. In 2012, she appeared as Mercedes in ABC Family's series, The Secret Life of the American Teenager.

In 2018, Tarver appeared as Jesse in 8 episodes of HBO series, Ballers. She was cast as Cydney Walker in the ABC Signature television pilot, None of the Above, in 2021.

Personal life
Tarver married David Blaise on July 19, 2014.

Filmography

Source: - IMDb

Discography

Studio albums

Reissues

Extended plays

Singles

As a featured artist

Promotional singles

Other appearances

Music videos

Songwriting credits 

Source: - Discography at Spotify
Source: - Discography at AllMusic

References

External links
Official site

1989 births
21st-century American actresses
Actresses from Georgia (U.S. state)
American child actresses
American child models
American child singers
Female models from Georgia (U.S. state)
American women singer-songwriters
American singer-songwriters
American television actresses
Child pop musicians
Living people